The New Guinea free-tailed bat (Austronomus kuboriensis), sometimes designated the New Guinea mastiff bat, is a species of free-tailed bat that inhabits the Chimbu highlands of Papua New Guinea. Although Koopman described A. kuboriensis as a subspecies of the nearby A. australis, the 2005 reference catalogue Mammal Species of the World suggested that analysis had established these as distinct species.

See also
List of mammals of Papua New Guinea

References

Austronomus
Mammals described in 1968
Mammals of Papua New Guinea
Bats of Oceania
Endemic fauna of Papua New Guinea
Bats of New Guinea